{{Infobox Newspaper
| name               = Sing Tao Daily
| image              = SingTaoDailyToronto.jpg
| image_size         = 220px
| caption            = Sing Tao Dailys head office in Markham, Ontario
| type               = Daily newspaper
| format             = Broadsheet
| foundation         = 1978
| ceased publication = 
| owners             = 
| publisher          = 
| editor             = 
| chiefeditor        = 
| assoceditor        = 
| staff              = 
| language           = Chinese
| circulation        = 180,000
| headquarters       = 221 Whitehall Drive, Markham, OntarioL3R 9T1
| oclc               = 
| ISSN               = 
| website            = Sing Tao Canada 
}}

The Sing Tao Daily, or Sing Tao''' for short, is a Chinese language newspaper based in Toronto, Ontario. It is jointly owned by the Hong Kong-based Sing Tao News Corporation and the Canadian publishing conglomerate Torstar Corporation, parent company of the Toronto Star.Sing Taos connection to the Toronto Star was through Andrew V. Go, former Star vice president for business ventures.   Go's father, Go Puan Seng, was the publisher of The Fookien Times, then the Philippines' largest Chinese-language newspaper which also published the Philippine edition of the Sing Tao, and was a family friend of then Sing Tao Group's Sally Aw.

The Toronto edition is formally called the Canada Eastern Edition (加東版  Pinyin: Jiā Dōng Bǎn). A Canada Western Edition (加西版 Pinyin: Jiā Xī Bǎn) in Vancouver, British Columbia and an Alberta Edition in Calgary, Alberta have also been published since 1988.

According to former editor-in-chief of the newspaper, Victor Ho, and Jonathan Manthorpe, author of Claws of the Panda, the newspaper's editorial stance is pro-Beijing.

Reception

In 2009, the top editor of Toronto's Sing Tao Daily, Wilson Chan, was fired shortly after it was revealed that he drastically modified an original Toronto Star article on Tibet to remove criticisms of the Chinese government, before publishing the story in Sing Tao. The decision to remove Chan is said to have come from Torstar Corp, who owns a majority share in Sing Taos Canadian edition.

The original story, "Chinese Canadians Conflicted on Tibet", which ran on April 13, 2008, was written by a reporter for the Toronto Star, an English-language newspaper also owned by Torstar Corporation. The relationship gives Sing Tao rights to translate and publish stories from the Star''. Chan's edits to the Chinese language story, which were revealed by media outlets in 2009, included changing the headline to, "The West Attacks China With Tibet Issue, Inciting Chinese Patriotism Overseas". The edited version omitted all quotes critical of the Chinese regime's human rights abuses and added comments blaming the West for "suppressing China" with media reports of the crackdown in Tibet.

See also
List of newspapers in Canada
Sing Tao News Corporation
Chinese Canadians in the Greater Toronto Area

References

External links

 Sing Tao Canada 

Chinese-Canadian culture in Toronto
Chinese-language newspapers published in Canada
Newspapers published in Toronto
Newspapers published in Vancouver
Chinese-language newspapers (Traditional Chinese)
Torstar publications
Publications established in 1978
Daily newspapers published in Ontario
1978 establishments in Ontario
Aw family
Sing Tao News Corporation